Aculus truncatus is a species of mite which causes galls on the leaves of purple willow (Salix purpurea). It was first described by Alfred Nalepa in 1892.

Description
The gall is a short,  narrow twisted, downward roll on the leaves of purple willow (S. purpurea). It is lined with red hairs and contains mites.

Similar looking galls have also been found on common osier (S. viminalis) and on sallows, which could also be A. truncatus. The mites should be identified by an expert.

A. truncatus has also been known to use Salix alba as a host.

References

External links
 

Eriophyidae
Animals described in 1892
Arachnids of Europe
Taxa named by Alfred Nalepa
Willow galls